The North–South Arterial Highway is a  expressway located within Oneida County, New York. It contains segments of the following highways:
New York State Route 12 and New York State Route 8 north of Interstate 90 (New York State Thruway) 
 Interstate 790 and New York State Route 5 south of Interstate 90 (New York State Thruway)

State highways in New York (state)